Ramrao Narayanrao Yadav  was member of 8th Lok Sabha from Parbhani (Lok Sabha constituency) in Maharashtra state, India.

He was elected to 7th, 3rd Lok Sabha and 2nd Lok Sabha from Parbhani.

References

Year of birth unknown
People from Parbhani district

India MPs 1962–1967
India MPs 1957–1962
India MPs 1980–1984
India MPs 1984–1989
Maharashtra politicians
Lok Sabha members from Maharashtra
Indian National Congress politicians from Maharashtra